정소연 may refer to individuals:
Soyeon Jeong (born 1983), science fiction writer
Jeong So-yeon (born 1994), girl group member, known professionally as "Soyeon"